Zack (and variant spellings Zach, Zac, Zak, Zakk) is sometimes a given name, but more often it is a hypocorism or short form of another given name, usually Zachary in the English speaking world, which derives from Zechariah.

Name
Zach Allen (born 1997), American football player
Zach Aguilar (born 1998), American voice actor
Zack Bailey (born 1995), American football player
Zach Banner (born 1993), American football player
Zack Baun (born 1996), American football player
Zach Boren (born 1991), American football player
Zach Borenstein (born 1990), American baseball player
Zach Braff (born 1975), American actor known for his role in television series Scrubs
Zac Brown (born 1978), lead singer in American country music band Zac Brown Band
Zach Callison (born 1997), American voice actor
Zac Champion (born 1984), American footballer
Zack Conroy (born 1985), American actor
Zack Cozart (born 1985), American Major League Baseball player
Zach Cunningham (born 1994), American football player
Zach Curlin (1890–1970), American football and basketball player and coach
Zach Davidson (born 1998), American football player
Zach Day (born 1978), American Major League Baseball player
Zac Efron (born 1987), American actor 
Zac Farro (born 1990), American drummer for Paramore
Zac Foley (1970–2002), British musician, bass guitarist for EMF
Zack Fleishman (born 1980), American tennis player
Zach Galifianakis (born 1969), American comedian
Zack Gelof, American baseball player
Zach Gentry (born 1996), American football player
Zack Golditch (born 1995), American football player
Zac Goldsmith (born 1975), English environmentalist and politician
Zack Greinke (born 1983), American Major League Baseball player
Zack O'Malley Greenburg (born 1985), American writer, journalist, and former child-actor
Zach Hankins (born 1996), American basketball player for Hapoel Jerusalem of the Israeli Basketball Premier League
Zac Hanson (born 1985), American musician, drummer for Hanson
Zach Harrison (born 2001), American football player
Zach Hill (born 1979), American multi-instrumentalist and visual artist
Zach Hyman (born 1992), Canadian NHL ice hockey player
Zach Iscol (born 1978), American entrepreneur, US Marine, and candidate in the 2021 New York City Comptroller election
Zach Jackson (born 1983), American former Major League Baseball player
Zach Jackson (born 1994), American minor league baseball player
Zack Kassian (born 1991), Canadian NHL ice hockey player
Zak Keith, British guitarist
Zach King (born 1990), American internet personality, filmmaker, and illusionist
Zach Kosnitzky, American participant in Kid Nation 
Zach LaVine (born 1995), American basketball player
Zach Lowe (born 1977), American sportswriter
Zack Martin (born 1990), American National Football League player
Zack Mesday (born 1994), American football player
Zach Mettenberger (born 1991), American National Football League quarterback
Zack Morris (born 1998), English actor
Zack Moss (born 1997), American football player
Zach Myers (born 1983), American former bass player and current guitarist for rock band Shinedown
Zach Norton (born 1981), American football player
Zach Parise (born 1984), American ice hockey player
Zach Penprase (born 1985), Israeli-American baseball player for the Israel National Baseball Team
Zach Pfeffer (born 1995), American soccer player
Zacch Pickens (born 2000), American football player
Zack Pinsent (born  1994), British costumer
Zac Posen (born 1980), American fashion designer
Zac Purton (born 1983), horse racing jockey
Zach Randolph (born 1981), American basketball player
Zack de la Rocha (born 1970), American lead singer of Rage Against the Machine
Zack Rosen (born 1989), All-American basketball player at Penn; plays for Maccabi Ashdod in Israel
Zack Sanchez (born 1993), American football player
Zack Shada (born 1992), American actor
Zach Sieler (born 1995), American football player
Zack Snyder (born 1966), American film director and screenwriter 
Zac Stacy (born 1991), American football player
Zak Starkey (born 1965), English drummer for The Who and Oasis
Zack Test (born 1989), American rugby union player
Zach Thomas (disambiguation), multiple people
Zack Thornton (born 1988), American baseball player
Zach Tom (born 1999), American football player
Zach Triner (born 1991), American football player
Zach VanValkenburg (born 1998), American football player
Zach Villa (born 1987), American actor, singer, songwriter, dancer, and musician
Zach Weiner (born 1982), American webcomic author of Saturday Morning Breakfast Cereal
Zack Weiss (born 1992), American-Israeli Major League Baseball player
Zack Werner, Canadian artist, producer, lawyer and manager in the music industry
Zack Wheat (1888–1972), American Major League Baseball player
Zach Whitmarsh (born 1977), Canadian track and field athlete
Zach Williams (born 1981), American Christian musician
Zach Wilson (born 1999), American football player
Zach Wood (born 1993), American football player
Zakk Wylde (born 1967), American guitarist for Ozzy Osbourne and founder of Black Label Society

In fiction
Zack, a security guard played by Naresh Kumar in the British web series Corner Shop Show.
 Zack Addy, in the television series Bones
 Zack Allan, in the television series Babylon 5 
 Zak Dingle, in the British soap opera Emmerdale
 Zach Florrick, the eldest of Alicia's children in The Good Wife
 Zack Fair, in the role-playing game Final Fantasy VII and its spin-offs
 Zack Hudson, in the British soap opera EastEnders
 Zack Johnson, in The Big Bang Theory
 Zack Lane, in the novel Zack by William Bell
 Zack Martin, in the television series The Suite Life of Zack and Cody 
 Zak McKracken, hero of the adventure game Zak McKracken and the Alien Mindbenders
 Zack Mooneyham, a character in School of Rock
 Zack Morris (Saved by the Bell), in  television series Saved by the Bell
 Zach Nichols, in the American police procedural television drama Law & Order: Criminal Intent
 Zak Saturday, one of the main characters in the cartoon series The Secret Saturdays
 Zac, a main character in the Nickelodeon series Shimmer and Shine
 Zach Stevens, in The O.C.
 Zack Taylor, in the television series Mighty Morphin Power Rangers 
 Zack Underwood, one of the main characters in Milo Murphy's Law
 Zach Varmitech, one of the antagonists in Wild Kratts
 Zack (Battlestar Galactica)
 Zack, in the computer game The Daedalus Encounter
 Zack (Dead or Alive), in the video game series Dead or Alive
 Zak (TUGS), in the television series TUGS
 Zack, one of the title characters of the video game Zack & Wiki: Quest for Barbaros' Treasure
 Zack, Kamen Rider Knuckle in Kamen Rider Gaim
 Zack, the main character in Zack & Quack, an animated television series
 Zakk, one of the protagonists of the film Deathgasm

See also
Zechariah (given name)
Zachary
Zak (given name)

Masculine given names
English masculine given names
Hypocorisms